Niutron is a Chinese electric car company founded by Niu Technologies co-founder Yan Li on December 15, 2021. The company is based in Beijing with its design center located in Shanghai.

History
Niutron was founded by Yan Li, co-founder of electric scooter manufacturer Niu Technologies and former CTO of Chinese technology company Baidu and officially announced on December 15, 2021. That day, digital images of the company's first production vehicle, the Niutron NV mid-size electric SUV, were revealed. 

In March 2022, Niutron revealed the production version of the NV. It is planned to begin production in Guangzhou in September 2022.

References

Chinese companies established in 2021
Vehicle manufacturing companies established in 2021
Electric vehicle manufacturers of China